Gnaphosa artaensis is a ground spider species found in Mallorca.

See also 
 List of Gnaphosidae species

References

External links 

Gnaphosidae
Fauna of Mallorca
Spiders of Europe
Spiders described in 2011